Armenia is set to participate in the Eurovision Song Contest 2023 in Liverpool, United Kingdom, having internally selected Brunette to represent the country with the song "Future Lover". Brunette was announced as the Armenian entrant to the contest on 1 February 2023, while her song was presented to the public on 15 March 2023.

Background 

The nation briefly withdrew from the contest on two occasions: in  due to long-standing tensions with then-host country Azerbaijan, and in  due to social and political crises in the aftermath of the Second Nagorno-Karabakh War. In , Armenia returned to the contest, with its entry "Snap" performed by Rosa Linn qualifying for the final and placing 20th overall. 

The Armenian national broadcaster, Public Television of Armenia (AMPTV), broadcasts the event within Armenia and organises the selection process for the nation's entry. Following their one-year absence, AMPTV confirmed their intentions to participate at the 2023 Eurovision Song Contest on 20 October 2022. Armenia has used various methods to select the Armenian entry in the past, such as internal selections and a live televised national final to choose the performer, song or both to compete at Eurovision. For 2023, the broadcaster opted to continue selecting the Armenian entry internally.

Before Eurovision

Internal selection 
The Armenian entry for the Eurovision Song Contest 2023 was internally selected by AMPTV. On 25 January 2023, Armenian media reported that singer Brunette had been selected to represent the country with an R&B style song, though AMPTV did not comment. On 1 February 2023, AMPTV officially confirmed that Brunette would represent Armenia in the Eurovision Song Contest 2023. The singer stated that "I am happy to share the news with you. I just create music, and this time I will share it with the European audience!". Her entry, "Future Lover", was released on 15 March 2023.

At Eurovision 
According to Eurovision rules, all nations with the exceptions of the host country and the "Big Five" (France, Germany, Italy, Spain and the United Kingdom) are required to qualify from one of two semi-finals in order to compete for the final; the top ten countries from each semi-final progress to the final. The European Broadcasting Union (EBU) split up the competing countries into six different pots based on voting patterns from previous contests, with countries with favourable voting histories put into the same pot. On 31 January 2023, an allocation draw was held, which placed each country into one of the two semi-finals, and determined which half of the show they would perform in. Armenia has been placed into the second semi-final, to be held on 11 May 2023, and has been scheduled to perform in the first half of the show.

References 

2023
Countries in the Eurovision Song Contest 2023
Eurovision